This is the list of the proper names for the stars in the constellation Pisces. (Used modern western astronomy and uranography only).

List

Etymologies

α Psc 
 Alrescha (Al Rescha, Al Richa, Alrischa, Al Rischa, Alrisha, El Rischa):
 ＜ (ar) al-rishā’ , "the cord" ＜ (ind.-ar) al-Rishā’, "the Rope (of the well-Bucket)", for β And.  Later, wrongly transferred to this star.
 Okda:
 ＜ (ar) ‘uqdah, "knot" ＜ (sci.-ar) ‘aqd al-khayṭayn, "the knot of the cord", for this star.
 Kaitain:
 ＜ (ar) khayṭayn, "cord" ＜ (sci.-ar) ‘aqd al-khayṭayn, for this star.

β Psc 
 Fum al Samakah:
 ＜ (sci.-ar) fam al-Samakah, "the mouth of the Fish", for this star.

η Psc 
 Alpherg:
  ＜ (ar) al-farg, "the beak-shaped spout (of the well-Bucket)", ＜ (ind.-ar) al-farg al-Muqaddam, "the Fore Spout", for β and α Peg as 24th Arabic lunar mansion, or al-farg al-Mu'akhkhar, "the Rear Spout", for α And and γ Peg as 25th Aerabic lunar mansion, later erroneously transferred to this star.
 Kullat Nūnu:
 The star had an obscure Babylonian name Kullat Nūnu−the latter being the Babylonian word for fish and the former "Kullat" referring to either a bucket or the cord that ties the fish together.

ο Psc 
 Torcularis Septentrionalis:
 ＜ (la) torcularis septentrionalis, "northern press".

See also 
 List of stars in Pisces
 List of star names

Notes

References 
 
 

Pisces (constellation)
Pisces